The Last Czars is a six-part English-language docudrama that premiered on Netflix on July 3, 2019.  The series follows the reign of Nicholas II, the last emperor of Russia's Romanov Dynasty, from his accession to the throne in 1894 to his execution along with the Romanov family in 1918.

Cast
 Robert Jack as Czar Nicholas II
 Susanna Herbert as Czarina Alexandra Feodorovna
 Ben Cartwright as Grigori Rasputin
 Oliver Dimsdale as Pierre Gilliard
 Bernice Stegers as Dowager Czarina Maria Feodorovna
 Gerard Miller as Prince Yusupov
 Steffan Boje as Dr. Schmidt
 Indre Patkauskaite as Ana Anderson
 Elsie Bennett as Grand Duchess Elizabeth Feodorovna
 Jurga Seduikyte as Militsa
 Duncan Pow as Yurovsky
 Karina Stungyte as Grand Duchess Stana Nikolaevna
 Milda Noreikaite as Grand Duchess Militza Nikolaevna
 Michelle Bonnard as Praskovya
 Gavin Mitchell as Grand Duke Sergei Alexandrovich of Russia
 Karolina Elzbieta Mikolajunaite as Grand Duchess Olga Nikolaevna
 Aina Norgilaite as Grand Duchess Tatiana Nikolaevna
 Gabija Pazusyte as Grand Duchess Anastasia Nikolaevna
 Digna Kulionyte as Grand Duchess Maria Nikolaevna
 Oskar Mowdy as Tsarevich Alexei
 Milda Noreikaite as Shura

Episodes

Reception
On the review aggregation website Rotten Tomatoes, the series has an approval rating of 60% with an average rating of 6/10, based on 10 reviews.

The series was described by The Guardian as "a surreal Wikipedia entry brought to life", in a review which pointed out production errors such as a bottle with the word “vodka” misspelled in Cyrillic, and a shot of Red Square, supposedly in 1905, featuring Lenin's Mausoleum which was not built until 1924.

References

External links
 
 
 

2019 American television series debuts
Cultural depictions of Grand Duchess Anastasia Nikolaevna of Russia
Cultural depictions of Nicholas II of Russia
Cultural depictions of Grigori Rasputin
English-language Netflix original programming